John Nicholson (24 June 1892 – 27 September 1967) was an Australian rules footballer who played with University and Melbourne. As with many other University players, he moved to Melbourne, although his transition was not as successful as most other players.

Sources
Holmesby, Russell & Main, Jim (2007). The Encyclopedia of AFL Footballers. 7th ed. Melbourne: Bas Publishing.

External links

Profile on Demonwiki

1892 births
1967 deaths
University Football Club players
Melbourne Football Club players
Australian players of Australian rules football
People educated at Geelong College